Klaus Rickert (born 22 July 1946 in Bekmünde) is a German politician for the Free Democratic Party.

He was elected to the Lower Saxon Landtag in 2003, and has been re-elected on one occasion.

External links

Official biography

Free Democratic Party (Germany) politicians
Members of the Landtag of Lower Saxony
1946 births
Living people